Statistics of Qatar Stars League for the 1964–65 season.

Overview
Al-Maref won the championship.

References
Qatar - List of final tables (RSSSF)

Qatar Stars League seasons
Qatar
football